Protaceratherium is an extinct genus of rhinoceros from the Oligocene and Miocene of Eurasia.

It was a primitive, lightly built rhinoceros that was adapted to running.

References

Oligocene rhinoceroses
Oligocene mammals of Europe
Oligocene mammals of Asia
Miocene rhinoceroses
Miocene mammals of Europe
Miocene mammals of Asia